Panasówka  is a village in the administrative district of Gmina Tereszpol, within Biłgoraj County, Lublin Voivodeship, in eastern Poland.

The village has a population of 266.

On September 3, 1863 the Battle of Panasówka, one of the largest battles of the January Uprising, was fought near the village. In the battle, Polish insurgents supported by Hungarian volunteers defeated much more numerous Russian troops.

References

Villages in Biłgoraj County